Orthelimaea is a genus of Asian bush crickets in the subfamily Phaneropterinae. Species in this genus are found in India, Indo-China, and Malesia.

Description
Orthelimaea is now considered a separate genus in the tribe Elimaeini, having been described as a subgenus of the genus Elimaea. Species in this genus are characterised by the straight fore femora, whereas those of Elimaea and the genus Ectadia are "more or less curved". Ovipositors of the latter genera are similar, but are quite dissimilar in the type species of Orthelimaea, where the ovipositor has much larger denticles (tooth-like projections).

Species
The Orthoptera Species File includes:
 Orthelimaea bezborodovi Gorochov & Storozhenko, 2010
 Orthelimaea carispina (Ingrisch & Shishodia, 1998)
 Orthelimaea flavolineata (Brunner von Wattenwyl, 1878)
 Orthelimaea himalayana (Ingrisch, 1990)
 Orthelimaea insignis (Walker, 1869)
 Orthelimaea kanburi Ingrisch, 2011
 Orthelimaea klinghardti (Krausze, 1903)
 Orthelimaea leeuwenii (Karny, 1926)— type species (locality: near Bangkok, Thailand)
 Orthelimaea minor (Brunner von Wattenwyl, 1891)
 Orthelimaea securigera (Brunner von Wattenwyl, 1878)
 Orthelimaea trapezialis Liu, 2011
 Orthelimaea volsella Ingrisch, 2011

References

External links
Photo at Dreamstime.com: O. leeuwenii

Phaneropterinae
Tettigoniidae genera
Orthoptera of Asia